The 1986–87 Football League Cup (known as the Littlewoods Challenge Cup for sponsorship reasons) was the 27th season of the Football League Cup, a knockout competition for England's top 92 football clubs.

The competition began on 25 August 1986, and ended with the final on 5 April 1987. The final was played between Arsenal and Liverpool. The match, played in front of 96,000 spectators at Wembley Stadium, was won by Arsenal 2–1.

Luton Town were thrown out of the competition when they refused to allow Cardiff City fans to attend the match at Kenilworth Road. This was at the moment when club's then chairman, Conservative MP David Evans, tried to introduce a scheme effective from the start of 1986–87 banning all visiting supporters from the ground, and requiring home fans to carry identity cards when attending matches.

First round

First Leg

Second Leg

Second round

First Leg

Second Leg

Luton Town v Cardiff City
Luton Town were thrown out of the competition when they refused to allow Cardiff City fans to attend the match at Kenilworth Road.

This allowed Cardiff a bye into the Third Round.

Third round

Ties

Replays

Fourth round

Ties

Replay

Fifth Round

Ties

Replay

Semi-finals
North London rivals Arsenal and Tottenham Hotspur were both in the league title race this season and the League Cup semi-final paired them together, where the scores were equal over two legs before Arsenal won the replay. Liverpool, four time winners earlier in the decade, were held to a 0–0 draw at Southampton in the first leg of the other semi-final before triumphing 3–0 at Anfield.

First Leg

Second Leg

Replay

Final

Match details

References

General

Specific

EFL Cup seasons
1986–87 domestic association football cups
Lea
Cup